Seleucia-on-the-Hedyphon (also transliterated as Seleuceia, Seleukeia; formerly Soloke or Soloce, Sodome, and Sele, also Surak) was an ancient city on the Hedyphon (now called the Karkheh River) in Susa (earlier Elam), east of Mesopotamia, currently the site of Ja Nishin, Khuzestan province, Iran.

References

External links
Hazlitt, Classical Gazetteer, "Seleucia"

Seleucid colonies
Former populated places in Iran
History of Khuzestan Province